Barna Putics (born 18 August 1984) is a Hungarian handballer who plays for French top division team Tremblay-en-France Handball. He is also member of the Hungarian national team.

Achievements
Nemzeti Bajnokság I:
Winner: 2005, 2006, 2008
Magyar Kupa:
Winner: 2005, 2007
Slovenian Championship:
Runner-up: 2009
Slovenian Cup:
Winner: 2009
EHF Cup Winners' Cup:
Finalist: 2012

Individual awards
   Silver Cross of the Cross of Merit of the Republic of Hungary (2012)

References

External links
 Barna Putics career statistics at Worldhandball

1984 births
Living people
Sportspeople from Pécs
Hungarian male handball players
Handball players at the 2012 Summer Olympics
Expatriate handball players
Hungarian expatriate sportspeople in Germany
Hungarian expatriate sportspeople in Spain
Hungarian expatriate sportspeople in Slovenia
Olympic handball players of Hungary
Hungarian expatriate sportspeople in France